Happy Valentine's Day can refer to:

Music
"Happy Valentine's Day" a song by OutKast from the 2003 album Speakerboxxx/The Love Below
"Happy Valentine's Day" a song played by Billy Boy On Poison
"Happy Valentine's Day", a song by Psyopus from the 2007 album Our Puzzling Encounters Considered
Happy Valentine's Day, a 2006 album by Phil Keaggy

Films
Happy Valentine's Day (film), a 2006 film that won a 28th Young Artist Award
Happy Valentine's Day, a 2017 web series by Taiwanese actor Jay Shih

See also
 Valentine's Day (disambiguation)